Ramphogordius is a genus of worms belonging to the family Lineidae.

The species of this genus are found in Great Britain.

Species:

Ramphogordius bicolor 
Ramphogordius pseudolacteus

References

Nemerteans